Súnas  are an Australian Celtic four-piece band based in Brisbane.

Members have included Sarah Calderwood, Paul Brandon, Mannie McAllister, Michael Patrick, Bridget Masters and Jamie Corfield. They play a wide range of instruments such as flute, whistles, bouzouki, mandolin, guitar, bodhran, gazoukie and fiddle.

Súnas released their debut album, A Breath Away from Shadow, in January 2008. They followed with Celtic Road in February 2011. The album peaked at No. 4 on the ARIA Classical Albums chart.

Band members

Sarah Calderwood
Paul Brandon
Mannie McAllister
Michael Patrick

Discography

 A Breath Away from Shadow (2008) - Independent
 Celtic Road (14 February 2011) - ABC Classics/Universal Music Australia (4764288) – AUS Classical: No. 4

References

External links

 

Musical groups from Brisbane